Emmons can refer to:

People
 Buddy Emmons (1937–2015), American musician
 Carlos Antoine Emmons (born 1973), American football player
 Carlos Emmons (politician) (1799–1875), New York physician and politician
Delos Carleton Emmons (1889–1965), United States general
 Ebenezer Emmons (1799–1863), American geologist
 Frederick Earl Emmons (1907-1999), American architect
 George F. Emmons (1811–1884), American admiral
 George T. Emmons (1852–1945), American ethnographic photographer
 Howard Wilson Emmons (1912–1998), American educator
 Kateřina Emmons (born 1983), Czech sport shooter
 Lyman W. Emmons (1885–1955), American businessman and politician
 Matthew Emmons (born 1981), American sport shooter
 Nathanael Emmons (1745–1840), American theologian
 Phillip Emmons, pen name of Bentley Little (born 1960), American author of horror novels
 Robert Emmons (1872–1928), American football coach at Harvard and yachtsman
 Samuel Franklin Emmons (1841-1911), American geologist
 Shirlee Emmons (1923–2010), American operatic soprano, writer on music, and voice teacher

Places
In the United States:
 Emmons, Minnesota
 Emmons, West Virginia
 Emmons County, North Dakota
 Emmons Glacier, Washington
 Mount Emmons (Alaska)
 Mount Emmons (Colorado)
 Mount Emmons (New York)
 Mount Emmons (Utah)

Other uses
 USS Emmons (DD-457)

See also
 Ammons, a surname